Cladonia lichexanthonica is a rare species of saxicolous (rock-dwelling) lichen in the family Cladoniaceae. Found in Bahia, Brazil, it was formally described as a new species in 2018 by lichenologists André Aptroot and Marcela Eugenia da Silva Cáceres. Cladonia lichexanthonica is only known to occur at the type locality (part of the Chapada Diamantina mountains), and is only known from the type specimen. The specific epithet lichexanthonica refers to the presence of lichexanthone, a secondary compound that was not previously known to occur in genus Cladonia.

See also
List of Cladonia species

References

lichexanthonica
Lichen species
Lichens described in 2018
Lichens of Northeast Brazil
Taxa named by André Aptroot
Taxa named by Marcela Cáceres